The Gagora catfish (Arius gagora) is a species of sea catfish in the family Ariidae. It was described by Francis Buchanan-Hamilton in 1822, originally under the genus Pimelodus. It is a migratory species found in the tropical marine, brackish and freshwater of Bangladesh, Myanmar, and India.

The Gagora catfish is of commercial importance as a food fish, but over-fishing has led to a population decline in the past two decades. Due to the decline, the IUCN redlist currently lists the species as Near Threatened.

References

gagora catfish
Catfish of Asia
Fish of Bangladesh
Fish of India
Fish of Sri Lanka
Marine fish of Asia
Taxa named by Francis Buchanan-Hamilton
gagora catfish